Banshgram Union is an Union parishad of Narail Sadar Upazila, Narail District in Khulna Division of Bangladesh. It has an area of 46.62 km2 48.69 km2 (18.80 sq mi) and a population of 12,481.

References

Unions of Narail Sadar Upazila
Unions of Narail District
Unions of Khulna Division